Arrogant is a primarily Danish extended play released by Danish-Chilean singer Medina. It was released in Denmark on 3 February 2014 on iTunes through Labelmade / A:larm. Medina announced the EP on the same day at the 2014 Zulu Awards, where she performed "Strip, Pt. 1" with rapper Kidd. Medina stated "There are many Danes who think I am arrogant, but I love myself, and why should I not allow myself to be proud of what I have achieved?" The EP is a showdown with the pop sound Medina has become known for, and according to the singer, has put her in the booth: "I've really needed it, because this is the music I come from."

Style
The EP's songs show heavy use of autotune, the songs were co-written by the Danish production team Pitchshifters (Mads Møller and Thor Nørgaard), and Medina.

Tracks

Release history

References

2014 EPs
Medina (singer) albums